Roberto Quiroz Gómez (born 23 February 1992) is an Ecuadorian professional tennis player. 
Quiroz is the nephew of Andrés Gómez and the cousin of Emilio Gómez and Nicolás Lapentti. He attended and played collegiate tennis at the University of Southern California.

In 2010 he won the finals stage of Boys' Doubles events on the French Open and US Open with Peruvian tennis player Duilio Beretta. They defeated Argentinian pair Facundo Argüello and Agustín Velotti 6–3, 6–2 in France and they won against Oliver Golding and Jiří Veselý 6–1, 7–5 in the United States.

Challenger and Futures finals

Singles: 12 (6–6)

Doubles: 32 (20–12)

Junior Grand Slam finals

Doubles: 2 (2 titles)

References

External links
 
 
 

1992 births
Living people
Ecuadorian male tennis players
French Open junior champions
Sportspeople from Guayaquil
Tennis players at the 2010 Summer Youth Olympics
Tennis players at the 2011 Pan American Games
US Open (tennis) junior champions
USC Trojans men's tennis players
Pan American Games silver medalists for Ecuador
Pan American Games medalists in tennis
Grand Slam (tennis) champions in boys' doubles
Tennis players at the 2019 Pan American Games
Competitors at the 2010 South American Games
South American Games medalists in tennis
South American Games gold medalists for Ecuador
Medalists at the 2011 Pan American Games
Medalists at the 2019 Pan American Games
21st-century Ecuadorian people